Reading Borough Council is the council for the unitary authority of Reading in Berkshire, England. Until 1 April 1998 it was a non-metropolitan district.

Political control
Since the first election to the council in 1973 political control of the council has been held by the following parties:

Non-metropolitan district

Unitary authority

Leadership

Political leadership is provided by the leader of the council, with the role of mayor being largely ceremonial in Reading. After local government reorganisation in 1974, the leading political role was the chair of the policy committee, which was informally called the leader of the council. The role of leader of the council was made a formal position following the Local Government Act 2000. The leaders of Reading Borough Council since 1974 have been:

Council elections

Non-metropolitan district elections
1973 Reading Borough Council election
1976 Reading Borough Council election
1977 boundary change and by-election (Number of councillors increased from 46 to 49.)
1979 Reading Borough Council election 
1983 Reading Borough Council election (New ward boundaries, number of councillors reduced from 49 to 45.)
1984 Reading Borough Council election
1986 Reading Borough Council election
1987 Reading Borough Council election
1988 Reading Borough Council election
1990 Reading Borough Council election
1991 Reading Borough Council election
1992 Reading Borough Council election
1994 Reading Borough Council election
1995 Reading Borough Council election
1996 Reading Borough Council election

Unitary authority elections
1997 Reading Borough Council election
1999 Reading Borough Council election
2000 Reading Borough Council election
2001 Reading Borough Council election
2002 Reading Borough Council election
2003 Reading Borough Council election
2004 Reading Borough Council election (New ward boundaries)
2006 Reading Borough Council election
2007 Reading Borough Council election
2008 Reading Borough Council election
2010 Reading Borough Council election
2011 Reading Borough Council election
2012 Reading Borough Council election
2014 Reading Borough Council election
2015 Reading Borough Council election
2016 Reading Borough Council election
2018 Reading Borough Council election
2019 Reading Borough Council election
2021 Reading Borough Council election
2022 Reading Borough Council election

Borough result maps

By-election results
By-elections are listed on the pages of the last council-wide election prior to the by-election, with the exception of the 1977 by-election below which was due to a boundary change and increase in number of councillors rather than needing to fill a vacancy on the council.

Thames by-election April 1977
On 1 April 1977 the borough was enlarged by the addition of parts of the parishes of Eye and Dunsden, Kidmore End and Mapledurham, all from South Oxfordshire. The number of councillors on Reading Borough Council was increased from 46 to 49 as a result. The two South Oxfordshire district councillors representing much of the transferred area automatically became Reading borough councillors without needing to be re-elected, representing a new ward of Caversham Park. These two were Geoff Lowe and Harold Stoddart, both Liberals (although Lowe later defected to the Conservatives in 1978). Reading's existing Thames and Caversham wards were also enlarged, and the increase in the size of Thames ward justified a fifth councillor being elected for that ward, for which a by-election was held on 21 April 1977, which was won by the Conservatives. After the by-election and two transfers, the balance of the council was 23 Conservatives, 13 Labour and 13 Liberals.

References

External links

 
Politics of Reading, Berkshire
Council elections in Berkshire
Unitary authority elections in England